Cucujomyces elegans is a species of fungi in the family Laboulbeniaceae. It is found in Argentina.

References

External links 

 
 Cucujomyces elegans at Mycobank

Laboulbeniaceae
Fungi described in 1917
Biota of Argentina